"Rescue Me" is a song recorded by Australian singer-songwriter Dannii Minogue, Joey Johnson and Dee Wright for Eurogroove's greatest hits album The Best Of (1995). The song features guest vocals by Minogue and was produced by Tetsuya Komuro. It was released as a single in Europe and Japan, and reached No. 1 on the Japanese International Singles chart.

Formats and track listings

CD single
 "Rescue Me"  (Radio Edit) – 5:43
 "Rescue Me" (Original Full Length mix) – 6:20
 "Rescue Me"  (Soul Fake remix) – 7:29

Notes

1995 singles
Dannii Minogue songs
Songs written by Tetsuya Komuro